Nuni is the Gur language continuum of the Nuna people of Burkina Faso. The northern and southern varieties are not mutually intelligible.

References

Languages of Burkina Faso
Gurunsi languages